South Tripura is an administrative district in the state of Tripura in northeastern India.

History
The district came into existence on 1 September 1970, when the entire state was divided into three districts.

Geography
The district headquarters are located at Belonia.

Divisions
District has three sub divisions (Belonia, Sabroom and Santirbazar).

The district resides in two Lok Sabha constituencies: Tripura West (shared with West Tripura district) and Tripura East (shared with Dhalai and North Tripura districts. It is also split between seven Legislative assembly constituencies : Belonia, Hrishyamukh, Jolaibari, Manu, Rajnagar, Sabroom and Santirbazar.

Demographics
According to the 2011 census South Tripura district has a population of 876,001, roughly equal to the nation of Fiji or the US state of Delaware. This gives it a ranking of 471st in India (out of a total of 640). Its population growth rate over the decade 2001–2011 was 14.03%. South Tripura has a sex ratio of 957 females for every 1000 males, and a literacy rate of 85.41%.

Flora and fauna

References

External links
 

 
Districts of Tripura
1970 establishments in Tripura